The Rugege Highlands forest chameleon (Kinyongia rugegensis) is a species of chameleon. It is endemic to the Rugege Highlands of Burundi, but likely occurs in the Nyungwe Forest in the immediately adjacent Rwanda. The Burundian records are from or near the Kibira National Park. It was formerly considered to be included in Kinyongia adolfifriderici.

References

Kinyongia
Lizards of Africa
Vertebrates of Burundi 
Endemic fauna of Burundi 
Reptiles described in 2017
Taxa named by Daniel F. Hughes
Taxa named by Chifundera Kusamba
Taxa named by Eli Greenbaum